Sebastijan Pregelj (born 29 July 1970) is a Slovenian writer.
In the second half of the 1990s Sebastijan Pregelj (b.1970) called attention to himself with his collections of short stories. During the last ten years, he has undoubtedly proven his mastery of storytelling with his novels. Five of them earned him nominations for Best Novel of the Year Award (the Kresnik Award). A wide variety of readers is drawn to his novels because of their broad and rich historical background, intertwined with legends as well as present-day reality that manage to combine the magical with the spiritual and the mystical. 
In 2020 Pregelj won The Cankar Prize, a new literature award for the most original piece of literature from the previous year - either fiction, play, essay or poetry, for »V Elvisovi Sobi«, a novel about a generation which was growing up while the former Yugoslavia was slowly disintegrating.
Sebastijan Pregelj has been featured in several anthologies in the Slovene, Slovak, German, Polish and English language. He is a member of the Slovenian Writers’ Association and Slovene PEN centre. He lives and works in Ljubljana.

Bibliography

Novels

 V Elvisovi sobi (2019) Dear Ali. Dear Elvis.
 Vdih. Izdih. (2017) Breathe In. Breathe Out.
 Kronika pozabljanja (2014) A Chronicle of Forgetfulness
 Pod srečno zvezdo (2013) Under a Lucky Star
 Mož, ki je jahal tigra (2010) The Man Who Rode a Tiger
 Na terasi babilonskega stolpa (2008) On the Terrace of the Tower of Babel
 Leta milosti (2004) Years of Mercy

Collections of short stories

 Prebujanja (2011)
 Svinje brez biserov (2002)
 Cirilina roža (1999)
 Burkači, skrunilci in krivoprisežniki (1996)

Children's literature

 K morju, 3. del iz zbirke Zgodbe s konca kamene dobe (2017)
 Do konca jezera in naprej, 2. del iz zbirke Zgodbe s konca kamene dobe (2016)
 Duh Babujan in nepričakovana selitev (2016)
 Deček Brin na domačem kolišču, 1. del iz zbirke Zgodbe s konca kamene dobe (2016)
 Duh Babujan in prijatelji (2014)

Other

 Literarne poti Ljubljane (2010, literary guide, co-written with Gašper Troha)
 Ljubljana Literary Trail (2011, literary guide, co-written with Gašper Troha)

Anthologies in which short stories by Pregelj have been published

 Ljubljana Tales, a collection of Central European contemporary writing in English (2012)
 Noc w Lublanie, an anthology of Slovene short stories in Polish (2009)
 A Lazy Sunday Afternoon; Litterae Slovenicae vol. 112 (XLV/3)(2007)
 Vně hranic : antologie současné slovinské krátké prózy, an anthology of contemporary Slovene short stories in Czech (2002)
 Die Zeit der kurzen Geschichte (2001)
 Čas kratke zgodbe (1998)

References

External links 
 Official site 
 Publishers site (GOGA) 
 Publishers site (Beletrina) 
 Children's book publishers site (MIŠ) 
10 Books from Slovenia
A Chronicle of Forgetting 
Cankar Award 

Slovenian writers
Living people
1970 births
Writers from Ljubljana